Paloverde is the Americanized name of Parkinsonia, a genus of flowering plants in the pea family, Fabaceae.

Paloverde may also refer to:
USS Paloverde (YN-86), a  Ailanthus-class net tender
Paloverde, the former name of Palo Verde, California

See also
 Palo Verde (disambiguation)